Podsrnetica is a village in the municipality of Petrovac, Republika Srpska, Bosnia and Herzegovina.

References

Populated places in Petrovac, Bosnia and Herzegovina